Hulasu Rural District is in the Central District of Shahin Dezh County, West Azerbaijan province, Iran. At the National Census of 2006, its population was 12,396 in 2,637 households. There were 10,606 inhabitants in 2,715 households at the following census of 2011. At the most recent census of 2016, the population of the rural district was 9,182 in 2,788 households. The largest of its 45 villages was Hachasu, with 1,416 people.

References 

Shahin Dezh County

Rural Districts of West Azerbaijan Province

Populated places in West Azerbaijan Province

Populated places in Shahin Dezh County